is the twelfth episode of the Japanese anime television series Neon Genesis Evangelion, which was created by Gainax. The episode was first broadcast on TV Tokyo on December 20, 1995. It was written by Hideaki Anno and Akio Satsukwa and directed by Hiroyuki Ishido. The series is set fifteen years after a worldwide cataclysm known as Second Impact and is mostly set in the futuristic city of Tokyo-3. The series' protagonist is Shinji Ikari, a teenage boy who is recruited by his father Gendo to the special military organization Nerv to pilot a bio-mechanical mecha named Evangelion into combat with beings called Angels. During the episode, Nerv's Major Misato Katsuragi recalls her past as a survivor of the Second Impact, while a new, large-sized Angel called Sahaquiel threatens to destroy the entire Nerv headquarters.

At the beginning of the production, the main enemy was supposed to be an Angel called Turel. The episode, part of the series' action arc, blends comedy and action together and is markedly positive in its portrayal of the characters' relationships, particularly those between protagonist Shinji and Misato, and Shinji and his father Gendo. "She said, 'Don't make others suffer for your personal hatred'" echoes Hideaki Anno's typical themes, presenting through the character of Misato an optimistic view of human endeavour at the expense of fatalism and determinism. The installment also features several religious references, including the Christian concept of original sin and the biblical story of Sodom and Gomorrah.

"She said, 'Don't make others suffer for your personal hatred'" drew a 7.4% audience share on Japanese television. It received a generally positive reception. Some reviewers criticised the banality of the plot and the brevity of the battle against Sahaquiel, while other critics praised the action, the optimism and the focus on the personal interrelationships between the main characters.

Plot
Misato Katsuragi, head of the strategic department of the special agency Nerv, recalls a trauma she experienced when she was fourteen years old. During an experiment a giant of light woke up at the south pole, causing the melting of the southern ice cap and the death of her father, Dr. Katsuragi; despite being at the south pole at the time of the incident, known as Second Impact, Misato managed to escape the disaster and survive. After the flashback, Misato is promoted in rank, and grudgingly celebrates her promotion with her subordinates, Evangelion mecha pilots Shinji Ikari and Asuka Langley Soryu.

Sahaquiel, the tenth specimen of a race of mankind's antagonists called Angels, makes its appearance in satellite orbit. The enemy is much larger than the Evangelion units, and the Nerv believes its attack strategy is to crash-land using its own body as a bomb.  Shinji, Asuka and fellow pilot Rei Ayanami, aboard their respective Evangelions, intercept the enemy, and by joining forces they succeed in defeating it against all of Nerv's probabilistic predictions. At the end of the confrontation, Nerv's Commander Gendo Ikari, who had remained at the South Pole on a mysterious expedition until then, congratulates his son Shinji. Shinji, thinking back to his father's unexpected words of praise, realises that this is why he boards the Evangelion and has decided to become a pilot.

Production

In 1993, Gainax published a presentation document for Neon Genesis Evangelion entitled , containing the initial synopsis for the twelfth episode. In the Proposal, the installment was supposed to be entitled . The Angel initially envisaged as the enemy of the episode was not to be Sahaquiel, but a certain Turel, "the rock of God", and only in the making did the phases change. Sahaquiel was initially supposed to look like a thin string, similar to Armisael, in order to show the audience that the Evangelion enemies can also be non-anthropomorphic. According to Kazuya Tsurumaki, assistant director of the series, the original scenario also included an "origami Angel" with a shape similar to the Möbius strip. Akio Satsukawa and series director Hideaki Anno wrote the script, while Masayuki handled the storyboards. Hiroyuki Ishido served as director for the installment. Satoshi Shiteta worked as a chief animator, while Mitsumu Wogi served as assistant character designer. The production also involved other companies, including Studio Ye Seong, Vega Enterteinment and Studio Deen.

Gualtiero Cannarsi, editor of the first Italian adaptation of the series, noted how the opening scene of Misato's flashback is almost entirely drawn with a sepia effect, except for the red elements; this choice emphasises the blood, accentuating the drama of the scene. For the scene set in Antarctica, in which a red sea full of salt columns is framed, the authors took up an idea already presented in the last episode of the series Nadia: The Secret of Blue Water, in which the series' main antagonist, Gargoyle, is turned into a salt statue. According to the character designer of the series, Yoshiyuki Sadamoto, the post-apocalyptic scenario and the use of the Dead Sea scrolls in Neon Genesis Evangelion are also a "side effect" of Nadia. The original scenario of the series also did not involve an explosion at the south pole, but a "Dead Sea evaporation accident". Even Misato's motto uttered during the operation against Sahaquiel, "The value of a miracle only becomes real when it has happened", echoes similar phrases and themes presented in previous Gainax works, such as Nadia and Gunbuster. Before the fight Rei also says that he does not eat meat; for the characterisation of the character Anno took inspiration from his personal experience as a long-time vegetarian and from Nadia Arwol, the protagonist of The Secret of Blue Water.

Megumi Hayashibara, Yuko Miyamura, Miki Nagasawa and Junko Iwao, voice actors of several main characters in the series, played audible announcers in various sequences of "She said, 'Don't make others suffer for your personal hatred'". Hayashibara also voiced a DJ speaker audible in the background in the scene where Shinji and Misato argue in the car. In addition to the original soundtrack, composed by Shiro Sagisu, the staff used the song "Bay side love story" by Masami Okui during the installment. Yoko Takahashi, who had already sung the opening theme song, also sang a 4beat version of "Fly Me to the Moon" which was later used as the episode's closing theme song.

Cultural references and themes
Writer Dani Cavallaro described "She said, 'Don't make others suffer for your personal hatred'" as an episode "axial to Evangelion's world". Throughout the installment, Shinji's psychology is explored, as well as his relationship with Misato Katsuragi. Another theme is the depiction of Shinji and Misato's inner world and Shinji's doubts about the real reason why he decides to pilot the Eva-01. The episode is the culmination of the positivity and lightness of the action arc of the series, in which the relationships of the protagonists seem to reach the point of resolution and the story towards a happy ending. Gendo, for example, portrayed in the early episodes as a cold and aloof father, congratulates Shinji and compliments him. Shinji realises after this event that he pilots the Eva-01 only to receive the approval of his parent, whose praise moves him to unexpected happiness. Writer Dennis Redmond has noted how Gendo's compliments are an "unusual moment" for Japanese culture, which "tends to recognise group achievement rather than individual merit". Misato, on the other hand, shows great faith in man's possibilities in the course of the plot, renouncing fatalistic or deterministic attitudes, echoing Hideaki Anno's work typical themes.

In "She said, 'Don't make others suffer for your personal hatred'", Asuka Langley Soryu, characterised by a grumpy and proud character, is annoyed by the achievements of his colleague Shinji. Gualtiero Cannarsi ascribed her conduct to a manly protest, a psychological term for a form of rebellion identifiable in women who are tired of the role stereotypically associated with the female gender. Asuka acts as if she tries to prove herself and surpass the male gender, fusing an "inferiority complex" and "radical rivalry".

In the course of the episode, Asuka defines Misato's generation, the one that experienced Second Impact and its aftermath firsthand, as a "generation born poor". The expression "Second Impact generation", also mentioned by a radio program in another scene in the episode, has been compared by Gualtiero Cannarsi to that of the "war generation". In the course of the preparations for the clash against Sahaquiel, the town of Matsushiro, where the second division of the Nerv is located, is also mentioned. In the real world, plans were made in the area of Matsushiro for the construction of underground imperial headquarters to be used after the Second World War.

"She said, 'Don't make others suffer for your personal hatred'" also contains religious references, particularly to Judaism and Christianity. In the first scene of the episode, Adam, the first Angel, is first portrayed in the form of a giant of light. Critic Marc MacWilliams noted Evangelion Adam is represented as "in Kabbalistic texts before his Fall". In another scene, a maritime fleet is seen transporting a gigantic object called the Spear of Longinus on an aircraft carrier, whose name is taken from the legendary Christian relic of the same name. In the same scene, Gendo Ikari and Kozo Fuyutsuki discuss the causes of Second Impact, mentioning the Christian concept of original sin; writer Dennis Redmond described their conversation as "quasi-theological". In the course of the discussion, columns of salt are framed throughout the red waters of the south pole. Comic Book Resources' Theo Kogod compared the melted sea of Antarctica to the Book of Revelation, in which the seas is turned red as blood. The pillars of salt constitute a reference to Sodom and Gomorrah and the episode of Lot's wife's transformation into a statue of salt. In Evangelion, Fuyutsuki speaks of the Second Impact as a "punishment" inflicted on mankind for its crimes, calling the South Pole, a prohibitive place for any living species, "a real Dead Sea". It is believed that Sodom and Gomorrah were in fact located near the southern end of the Dead Sea, known to be a completely prohibitive environment for the life of any aquatic species due to its extremely high salinity.

Reception
"She said, 'Don't make others suffer for your personal hatred'" was first broadcast on December 20, 1995, and drew a 7.4% audience share on Japanese television. In 1996 it ranked twelfth in Animage Anime Grand Prix poll of "Best Anime Episodes" with 81 votes. A line of official T-shirts about the episode has also been released.

Some critics have negatively received "She said, 'Don't make others suffer for your personal hatred'". Akio Nagatomi of The Anime Café gave the episode a positive rating, but complained about the "pretty stock" plot. Screen Rant similarly criticized the battle against Sahaquiel as overly quick. Other reviewers positively commented the installment. Film School Rejects' Max Covil praised "She said, 'Don't make others suffer for your personal hatred'", appreciating the focus on Misato's character and the finale, which he described as "one of the more uplifting endings in the series". Covil also listed a frame of Misato's flashback during Second Impact among the show's "perfect shots". Matthew Garcia of Multiversity Comics lauded the use of music and silences. Comic Book Resources ranked the clash between the three Evas and Sahaquiel third among the best of the show, describing it as "one of the most visually spectacular fights in the series". Anime News Network's Theron Martin said that the battles presented in the eleventh and twelfth episodes are "suitably exciting and creative, and it's a bit of an extra thrill to finally get to see all three Evas operating in tandem".

Polygon and IGN compared the unfurled design of the flying cryptid Jean Jacket in Jordan Peele's Nope with Sahaquiel. Peele also publicly made his fandom of the series known in the days leading up to the film's release. On July 25, 2022, Slashfilm confirmed via Peele's production notes for Nope that the film's principle premise and movie monster Jean Jacket had been specifically inspired by the Angels of Neon Genesis Evangelion; Peele himself stated that he was particularly impressed by Sahaquiel.

References

Citations

Bibliography

External links
 

1995 Japanese television episodes
Neon Genesis Evangelion episodes
Science fiction television episodes